The Former Tangrong Brick Kiln is a former brick manufacturing factory in Sanmin District, Kaohsiung, Taiwan.

History

Empire of Japan
The building was originally a tile factory established in 1899 by the Japanese government. Latest technology was introduced to this kiln and after around two decades, the brick production in this factory accounted for around 70% of bricks in Taiwan. Six more kilns capable of high yield bricks were added and the bricks produced here was branded the Taiwan Renga.

Republic of China
After the handover of Taiwan from Japan to the Republic of China in 1945, Taiwan Renga turned into a state-owned factory and was sold to a private company Tangrong Ironworks. However, after the company financial crisis in 1957, the Ministry of Economic Affairs acquired the factory in 1962. During the period of rapid economic growth, the kiln brought produced high profit for Tangrong but eventually the entire factory was shut down in 1985 due to rising labor costs and environmental concern. Since 2002, the site has remained idle and unoccupied. Its administrative building however was still continue to operate until 2002. In 2005, the site was renovated to be a tourist attraction.

Transportation
The building is accessible within walking distance west from Kaohsiung Main Station.

See also
 List of tourist attractions in Taiwan

References

1899 establishments in Taiwan
Buildings and structures in Kaohsiung
Industrial buildings completed in 1899
Kilns in Taiwan
National monuments of Taiwan
Tourist attractions in Kaohsiung